Arachnopeziza is a genus of fungi within the Hyaloscyphaceae family. The genus contains 15 species.

References

External links
Arachnopeziza at Index Fungorum

Hyaloscyphaceae
Taxa named by Karl Wilhelm Gottlieb Leopold Fuckel
Helotiales genera